William Kwasi Sabi (born August 23, 1966) is a Ghanaian politician and member of the Seventh Parliament of the Fourth Republic of Ghana representing the Dormaa East Constituency in the Brong-Ahafo Region on the ticket of the New Patriotic Party (NPP).

Early life and education 
Sabi was born on August 23, 1966. He hails from Wamfie in the Bono Region of Ghana. He holds a Bachelor of Science degree in Administration from the University of Ghana Legon and a Master's in Public Health from the University of Cape Town.

Career 
Sabi began his career as a hospital administrator at the Catholic Health Service, Sunyani from 1997 to 2003. He worked as a lecturer at the Catholic University College of Ghana from 2005 to 2009. In 2008, he became the operations manager for National Health Insurance Authority. He later worked as a management consultant with MDF West Africa Limited.

Politics 
Sabi contested for the seat of the Dormaa East constituency on the ticket of the New Patriotic Party in the 2012 general elections and won. He garnered 13,712 votes which represent 56.87% of the total votes cast and therefore defeated the other contestants including Ali Adjei Ibrahim, Felix Kumi Kwaku, Asante Oppong Alexander, and Adoma Hayford. He served as the Deputy Minister for the Ministry of Monitoring and Evaluation from 2016 to 2020, and currently, he is the Technical Advisor at the Monitoring and Evaluation Secretariat,  Office of the President.

Personal life 
Sabi is a Christian. He is married with one child.

References

Ghanaian MPs 2017–2021
1966 births
Living people
New Patriotic Party politicians
University of Ghana alumni
University of Cape Town alumni